"Say" is a song recorded by English band the Creatures (aka singer Siouxsie Sioux and drummer Budgie). It was co-produced by Steve Levine. The song is about Siouxsie's friend Billy Mackenzie (of the band the Associates) who took his life in 1997.

It was the second single taken from their third album, Anima Animus. It was released in both vinyl and CD formats. The 7" vinyl edition featured "Say" backed by "All She Could Ask For". Of the two CD editions, CD1 included both tracks from the 7" plus "Broken", while CD2 featured "Say (Witchman's Radio Friendly Mix)", "All She Could Ask For (Justice & Endemic Void's Dope Remix)" and "Say (Witchman's Very Long Remix)".

The single entered the UK Singles Chart at No. 72 in March 1999.

Notes

[Steve Levine]

1999 singles
The Creatures songs
1998 songs
Song recordings produced by Steve Levine
Songs written by Siouxsie Sioux
Songs written by Budgie (musician)